Richard Ian Cramb (born 7 September 1963) is a former Scotland international rugby union player.

Rugby Union career

Amateur career

He played for Harlequins.

He moved to London Scottish.

He then played for Gosforth.

He later coached at Newcastle, where he was the key mentor for Jonny Wilkinson.

Provincial career

He played for Anglo-Scots District in the Scottish Inter-District Championship.

International career

He played for Scotland 'B' twice; in 1985-1986, against Italy 'B' and France 'B'.

He made his full senior international debut in the group stages of the 1987 Rugby World Cup against Romania. He made four appearances in total for the Scotland.

He went on the 1988 Scotland rugby union tour of Zimbabwe, although full caps were not awarded. His last appearance against Australia at Murrayfield in 1988.

References

1963 births
Living people
Harlequin F.C. players
London Scottish F.C. players
Rugby union players from Falkirk
Scotland 'B' international rugby union players
Scotland international rugby union players
Scottish Exiles (rugby union) players
Scottish rugby union players
Rugby union fly-halves